The Round Valley Reservoir in Clinton Township in Hunterdon County, New Jersey, United States, was formed in 1960 when the New Jersey Water Authority constructed two large dams and flooded a large valley. The reservoir is named after the naturally formed circular valley surrounded by Cushetunk Mountain. The surrounding ridges of Cushetunk Mountain endure because they were underlaid with dense and durable volcanic rock diabase that cooled slowly under the surface of the earth. The reservoir covers what used to be a farming community, with remains of a school and a church on the lake floor among other buildings.

The reservoir contains  of water for use in central New Jersey, making it the largest in the state. Its water is distributed during times of drought via the nearby south branch of the Raritan River. The New Jersey Division of Wildlife (a department of the New Jersey Department of Environmental Protection) claims the reservoir is the southernmost body of water that contains naturally reproducing lake trout. This is one of only two lakes in New Jersey with lake trout, the other being Merrill Creek Reservoir in Warren County. Some of the other species of fish in the lake include bass, pickerel, catfish, american eel, yellow perch, brown trout, and rainbow trout. The park also has a wilderness area for camping, swimming and SCUBA diving facilities, a boat ramp and nature hiking and biking trails. The reservoir has been called the Bermuda Triangle of New Jersey, and over 26 people have drowned there since 1971. Six of them have never been found.

Gallery

References

External links
 [ Official Page from the NJDEP]
 New Jersey's Great Northwest Skylands Area Page
 NY-NJTC: Round Valley Recreation Area Trail Details and Info
 NY-NJTC: Cushetunk Mountain Nature Preserve Details and Info
 Round Valley Fishing Info
 Another drowning

Clinton Township, New Jersey
Protected areas of Hunterdon County, New Jersey
Reservoirs in New Jersey
State parks of New Jersey
Dams in New Jersey
United States state-owned dams
Bodies of water of Hunterdon County, New Jersey